The Korean Basketball League Defensive Player of the Year Award (Korean: 최우수수비상) is an annual Korean Basketball League (KBL) award given to the best defensive player during the regular season. The awardee is selected from players voted into the Defensive Best 5 (Korean: 수비 5걸) team. In addition to contributing to their team's overall defensive record, selected players must accumulate high averages in the following statistical categories: blocks, steals and defensive rebounds.

Winners

1997 to 2009–10

2011–12 to 2013–14
There were no Defensive Best 5 selections from the 2011–12 season until the 2013–14 season. During that time period, only the Defensive Player of the Year Award was awarded to one player.

2014–15 to present

Notes

References

External links
 주요기록 — 역대수상현황 / Major Records — Past Awards on the Korean Basketball League official website 

Korean Basketball League awards